Alhaji Habu Adamu Jajere is the former president of Independent Petroleum Marketers Association Of Nigeria (IPMAN). He led the association for four years. Habu Jajere was a winner of the Dr. Kwame Nkurumah African Leadership Award in Ghana.

He is currently an alternate Director to B.S. Kansagra in NIPCO PLC. He  studied Advanced Marketing from North East London Polytechnic. He worked with Bauchi State Ministry of Commerce before joining the Nigeria National Petroleum Corporation (NNPC). He was with the Pipelines & Products Marketing Company (PPMC) for 15 years before going into private business. For several years he was the National President of Independent Petroleum Marketers Association of Nigeria (IPMAN) that has over 600 networks of outlets and petroleum facilities that compete favorably with the major marketers.

He is the Chairman/CEO of Hajaaj Nigeria Ltd.

Habu Jajare was born in 1954, and is married with six children.

References 

1954 births
Living people
Nigerian business executives
Alumni of the University of East London